Mother Mary is a 1983 Soviet biopic written and directed by Sergey Kolosov and starring Lyudmila Kasatkina. It is loosely based on real life events of poet Maria Skobtsova. It was entered into the main competition at the 40th edition of the Venice Film Festival.

Plot 
The film tells the story of a bright and tragic fate of the Russian poet Elizaveta Yurevna Kuzmina-Karavayeva, in 1920 she emigrated to France and became a nun under the name of Mary. The shelter-based support it found many disadvantaged Soviet emigres. During the Second World War, Maria has become one of the heroines of the French Resistance.

Cast   
 Lyudmila Kasatkina as  Elizaveta Yurievna Kuzmina-Karavayeva
 Leonid Markov 	as Daniel Skobtsov
 Igor Gorbachyov 		as Bunakov-Fondaminsky	 
 Veronika Polonskaya 		as Sofia Pylenko
 Yevgeniya Khanayeva as Madame Langeais
 Vaclav Dvorzhetsky as  Nicolaevsky
 Alexander Timoshkin as  Jura
 Natalya Bondarchuk as  Nina
 Alexander Lebedev as  Anatoly

References

External links  

1980s biographical drama films
Soviet biographical drama films
Russian biographical drama films
1980s Russian-language films
Films directed by Sergey Kolosov
1983 drama films
1983 films
Films about the French Resistance
Films about nuns
Films set in 1920